Nicanor (Nīkā́nōr; lived 4th century BC) was the father of Balacrus, the Macedonian satrap of Cilicia. It is probably this Nicanor who is alluded to in an anecdote related by Plutarch of Philip II of Macedon, as a person of some distinction during the reign of that monarch.

References
Smith, William; Dictionary of Greek and Roman Biography and Mythology, "Nicanor (2)", Boston, (1867)

Notes

4th-century BC Macedonians